Lycée Vauban is the French High School located in Gasperich, a quarter of Luxembourg City, in southern Luxembourg.

History 
The school was founded in 1985 by French expatriates in Luxembourg, finding the teaching system in Luxembourg inadequate for their children. It was named after Sébastien Le Prestre de Vauban, a French architect who updated Luxembourg City's fortications under the occupation of Louis XIV . The school grew year by year, teaching pupils of many different nationalities. As a result, it has become a cosmopolitan high school, even if lessons are in French. In the early 2000s the government of Luxembourg increasingly subsidized the lycée, therefore, tuition fees have been curbed substantially, consequently more and more pupils can afford attending Lycée Vauban.

Directors 
Mr. Labouré
Mr. Scheitauer
Mr. Vogel
Mr. Bourgel
Mr. Hiebel
Mme. Reignez
Mme. Thiebert

External links 
 Lycée Vauban's official website

Vauban
Vauban
Educational institutions established in 1985
French international schools in Europe
1985 establishments in Luxembourg